Samy Kibula (born 7 August 1999) is a Congolese professional rugby league footballer who plays as a  forward for the Batley Bulldogs in the RFL Championship. 

He previously played for the Wigan Warriors and spent time on loan from Wigan at the Swinton Lions and the Dewsbury Rams in the Championship, and the London Skolars in Betfred League 1.

Background
Kibula was born in Kinshasa, Democratic Republic of the Congo. to a congolese father and South African mother.

Career

Wigan Warriors
In 2018 he made his Super League début for Wigan against the Huddersfield Giants.

Warrington Wolves
He agreed a deal to join Warrington ahead of the 2020 Super League season.

Newcastle Thunder
On 20 December 2020 Kibula joined the Newcastle Thunder on loan.

Bradford Bulls
On 5 October 2021 it was reported that he had signed for Bradford in the RFL Championship

References

External links

Wigan Warriors profile
SL profile

1999 births
Living people
Bradford Bulls players
Dewsbury Rams players
London Skolars players
Newcastle Thunder players
Rugby league props
Swinton Lions players
Warrington Wolves players
Wigan Warriors players
Democratic Republic of the Congo rugby league players